José Molina is the name of:

José Francisco Molina, Spanish football goalkeeper
José Molina (baseball), Puerto Rican baseball catcher
José Molina (writer) of the TV series Dark Angel, Firefly, and Law & Order: Special Victims Unit
José Angel Molina, Puerto Rican boxer
José Luis Molina, Costa Rican long-distance runner
José Gaspar Molina, former Honduran football referee
José Molina (mayor) aka José Molinas, mayor of Ponce, Puerto Rico in 1822